Pope Sylvester, or Silvester may refer to:
 Pope Sylvester I (314–335)
 Pope Sylvester II (999–1003)
 Pope Sylvester III (1045)
 Antipope Sylvester IV (1105–1111)

Silvester